Marie of Brandenburg-Kulmbach (14 October 1519 – 31 October 1567) was a Princess of Brandenburg-Kulmbach and by marriage Electress Palatine.

Biography 
Marie was the oldest child of the Margrave Casimir of Brandenburg-Kulmbach (1481–1527) from his marriage with Susanna of Bavaria (1502–1543), daughter of Duke Albert IV of Bavaria. After her father's death Marie was raised in the Lutheran faith by her uncle George Frederick.

On 21 October 1537, in Kreuznach, Marie married Frederick of Simmern (b. 1515), later Elector Palatine (1559–1576).  The marriage was happy.  Marie, who is described as intelligent and religious, influenced her Catholic husband toward Protestantism. In 1546, Frederick finally adopted Lutheranism and assumed the administration of the Franconian territories from his brother-in-law Albert Alcibiades, Margrave of Brandenburg-Kulmbach.  Since their family was living in reduced circumstances, Marie repeatedly turned to her uncle Albert of Prussia for financial assistance.

After the death of Marie's stepfather Otto-Henry in 1559, her consort Frederick became Elector Palatine. As Electress, she was closely involved in governmental affairs, though Frederick tolerated no direct interference. She had influence in religious questions, and as a strong Lutheran she was a determined opponent of the Zwinglians.

The Electress spent the last year of her life suffering from gout and was mostly confined to her bed.

She was buried in the Church of the Holy Spirit in Heidelberg.

Descendants 
By her marriage, Marie had the following children:
 Alberta (1538–1553)
 Louis VI, Elector Palatine (1539–1583)
m. (1) 1560 Princess Elizabeth of Hesse (1539–1582)
m. (2) 1583 Princess Anne of Ostfriesland (1562–1621)
 Elizabeth (1540–1594)
m. 1558 Duke John Frederick II of Saxony (1529–1595)
 Hermann Louis (1541–1556)
 John Casimir (1543–1592), Count Palatine of Simmern
m. 1570 Princess Elizabeth of Saxony (1552–1590)
 Dorothea Susanne (1544–1592)
m. 1560 Duke John William I of Saxe-Weimar (1530–1573)
 Albert (1546–1547)
 Anne Elizabeth (1549–1609)
m. (1) 1569 Landgrave Philip II of Hesse-Rheinfels (1541–1583)
m. (2) 1599 Count Palatine John Augustus of Veldenz-Lützelstein (1575–1611)
 Christopher, killed
 Charles (1552–1555)
 Cunigunde Jacobæa (1556–1586)
m. 1580 Count John VI of Nassau-Dillenburg (1536–1606)

Ancestors

References 
 August Kluckhohn (Hrsg.): Briefe Friedrich des Frommen, Kurfürsten von der Pfalz, C.A. Schwetschke und Sohn, 1868, S. 38 ff.
 August Kluckhohn: Wie ist Kurfürst Friedrich III von der Pfalz Calvinist geworden?, F. Straub, 1866, S. 427 f.

External links 
 http://www.geneall.net/D/per_page.php?id=2806

|-

1519 births
1567 deaths
Electresses of the Palatinate
Princesses of the Palatinate
House of Wittelsbach
House of Hohenzollern
People from Ansbach
16th-century German women
16th-century German people
Burials at the Church of the Holy Spirit, Heidelberg
Daughters of monarchs